DBPC may refer to:

Butylated hydroxytoluene (2,6-ditertiary-butylparacresol), an antioxidant
Don Bosco School, Park Circus
 DBus for process control
 Double-blind, placebo-controlled trial, a type of randomized controlled trial, usually of pharmaceuticals